The West African CFA franc (French: franc CFA or simply franc, ISO 4217 code: XOF; abbreviation: F.CFA) is the currency used by eight independent states in West Africa which make up the West African Economic and Monetary Union (UEMOA): Benin, Burkina Faso, Côte d'Ivoire, Guinea-Bissau, Mali, Niger, Senegal and Togo. These eight countries had a combined population of 105.7 million people in 2014, and a combined GDP of US$128.6 billion (as of 2018).

The currency is issued by the Central Bank of West African States (BCEAO), located in Dakar, Senegal, for the members of the UEMOA. The franc is nominally subdivided into 100 centimes but no coins or banknotes denominated in centimes have ever been issued. The production of CFA franc notes and coins has been carried out at Chamalières by the Bank of France since its creation in 1945.

The Central African CFA franc is of equal value to the West African CFA franc, and is in circulation in several central African states. They are both commonly referred to as the CFA franc.

In December 2019 it was announced that the West African CFA franc would be reformed, which will include renaming it the eco and reducing France's role in the currency.  The broader Economic Community of West African States (ECOWAS), of which the members of UEMOA are also members, plans to introduce its own common currency for its member states by 2027, which they have also formally adopted the name of eco for.

History 

The CFA franc was introduced to the French colonies in West Africa in 1945, replacing the French West African franc. The West African colonies and territories using the CFA franc were Ivory Coast, Dahomey, French Sudan, Mauritania, Niger, Sénégal, Togo and Upper Volta. The currency continued in use when these colonies gained their independence, except in Mali (formerly French Sudan), which replaced at par the CFA franc with its own franc in 1961.

In 1973, Mauritania replaced the CFA franc with the ouguiya at a rate of 1 ouguiya = 5 francs. Mali readopted the CFA franc in 1984, at a rate of 1 CFA franc = 2 Malian francs. The former Portuguese colony of Guinea-Bissau adopted the CFA franc in 1997, replacing the Guinea-Bissau peso at a rate of 1 CFA franc = 65 pesos.

The currency was pegged to the French franc at F.CFA 1 = F 2. from 1948, becoming 1 F.CFA = NF 0.02 after introduction of the new franc at 1 new franc = 100 old francs. In 1994 the currency was devalued by half to F.CFA 1 = F 0.01. From 1999 it has since been pegged to the euro at  €1 = F 6.55957 = F.CFA 655.957

Coins

For coins struck prior to the CFA franc, see French West African franc

In 1948, aluminium 1 and 2 franc coins were introduced. These were followed in 1956 by aluminium-bronze 5, 10, and 25 francs. All carried the name "Afrique Occidentale Française". In 1957, 10 and 25 franc coins were issued with the name of "Togo" were minted for use in that country, these were issued only for that year. From 1959, all coins have been issued by the BCEAO.

From 1959 onward, the overall size and composition of the coins changed little, however "République française" and the stylized Marianne bust was dropped from all coins, replaced with the title "Banque Centrale des États de l'Afrique de l'Ouest" with the design on the 1, 5, 10, and 25 francs featuring a gazelle's profile, carried over from colonial issues, and a tribal mask between the denomination, which has become the emblem of the West African monetary union. Nickel-Steel 100 franc coins were introduced in 1967, followed by the cupro-nickel 50 franc coins in 1972. These also featured the familiar tribal mask. Small, stainless steel 1 franc coins were introduced in 1976, replacing the larger aluminum 1 franc coins, and were struck until 1995. The 10 and 25 franc coins saw a redesign in 1980, depicting a family using a water pump and a young woman with chemistry tools, respectively. A bimetallic 250 franc coin was introduced in 1992 to reduce excess change. These coins, however, proved to be unpopular in many regions and were discontinued after 1996. They are however, still legal tender. In 2003, bimetallic 200 and 500 franc coins were introduced, replacing smaller denomination notes. Like all the other West CFA franc coins, these depicted the mask emblem.

Unlike some coins of the Central African CFA franc, no modern circulation coins have been issued depicting the names of individual member states, nor any letters or marks of indication.

All CFA coins depict both a mint mark, along with an engraver's privy mark. The mint mark is located on the reverse on the left side of the denomination or date while the engraver's mark is located on the right.

Banknotes 
When the CFA franc was introduced, notes issued by the Banque Centrale des États de l'Afrique Occidentale in denominations of 5, 10, 25, 50, 100, and 1,000 francs were in circulation. 500 franc notes were added in 1946, followed by those of 5,000 francs in 1948. In 1955, the Institut d'Emission de l'A.O.F. et du Togo took over the production of paper money, issuing notes for 50, 100, 500, and 1,000 francs.

In 1959, the BCEAO took over the issuance of paper money and reintroduced a 5,000 franc note. With the exception of a few early issues, the notes of the BCEAO carry a letter to indicate the country of issuance. The country letter codes are as follows:
 A – 
 B – 
 C – 
 D – 
 H – 
 K – 
 S – 
 T – 

The country codes are used to identify and categorise flow of cash between the CFA franc countries, as well as repatriating banknotes to their country of origin.

50-franc notes were last issued in 1959, with 100 francs not issued since 1965. 10,000 franc notes were introduced in 1977, followed by 2,500 franc notes in 1992.

In 2004, a new series of notes was introduced in denominations of 1,000, 2,000, 5,000, and 10,000 francs, with the 500 franc note having been replaced by a coin the year before. The newer notes contain updated security features and are more modern in design. The change was welcomed because of a perception that the old notes were dirty and disease-ridden. The colour of the 5,000-franc note was changed from blue to green. On November 30, 2012, the Banque Centrale des États de l'Afrique de l'Ouest (Central Bank of the West African States) issued a 500-franc banknote.

Controversy 
There has been some debate over whether the West African CFA franc serves as a way for France to keep influence in the region, often to the detriment to these nations. For example, one of the "rules" of the currency is that the central banks of all of the nations involved have to keep at least 50% of their foreign assets in the French Treasury. Some see this as a way to keep the currency stable while other see it as limiting the economic independence of the West African nations that are involved. Even though during the early 1950s to the mid-1980s, CFA countries experienced higher real GDP growth and lower inflation rates than other non-CFA Sub-Saharan countries, the economic shocks of the 1986 and 1993 caused the CFA franc to become increasingly overvalued and run increased deficits in the French Treasury. Some policymakers have argued that the CFA franc be tied to a basket of currencies rather than one currency as it currently is. Also, they state that the reserve requirement should be restructured in order to give CFA countries more economic freedom.

Exchange rates

See also
 Central African CFA franc
 Council of Arab Economic Unity (CAEU)
 Economic Community of West African States (ECOWAS)
 African and Malagasy Union (AMU)
 African Central Bank
 Eco (currency)

General:
 Monetary union
 Economy of Benin
 Economy of Burkina Faso
 Economy of Guinea-Bissau
 Economy of Ivory Coast
 Economy of Mali
 Economy of Niger
 Economy of Senegal
 Economy of Togo

References

External links 

  Union Economique et Monétaire Ouest Africaine (UEMOA) (Official Site of the West African Economic and Monetary Union)
 West African CFA franc Banknotes
 West African CFA franc Coins
 "The Many Varieties of West African States Banknotes" by Weldon D. Burson
 "The exchange rate of the CFA Franc BCEAO" (XOF)

Currency unions
Currencies introduced in 1945
1945 establishments in French West Africa
Fixed exchange rate